Leijn Loevesijn (born 2 January 1949) is a former Dutch cyclist.

At the 1968 Summer Olympics Loevesijn, together with Jan Jansen won a silver medal in the 2000 metres tandem race, and finished fifth at the sprint race and sixth in the time trial. At the Track Cycling World Championships he won a bronze medal in the sprint in 1970 and a gold medal in the sprint in 1971. Between 1968 and 1976 he won 11 national titles in sprint disciplines.

After that he became a professional. In 1971 he was  World Champion Sprint. He was the first Dutch World Champion since Jan Derksen in 1957, and it would take until 2004 before Theo Bos would succeed him. Loevesijn was eight times in row Dutch Champion sprint en won the "Grote Prijs van Amsterdam" three times.

He ended his career as a professional cyclist in 1976. Afterwards, he tried to combine his cycling activities with his work but in vain.
Until his retirement in 2014 Leijn Loevesijn performed as a planning engineer with the water management and sewage services of the city of Amsterdam. Currently he is indirectly involved in cycling.

Teams
1969: Batavus - Continental - Alcina
1970: Flandria - Mars
1971: TI - Carlton
1972: Raleigh
1973: Raleigh
1974: TI - Raleigh
1975: G.G.M.C. - Eskagé
1976: G.G.M.C. - Eskagé
1979: individual

Victories
1968
 NK 1 km timetrial, amateurs
 NK Tandem, amateurs; with Jan Jansen
 2e in Olympic Games, Tandem; with Jan Jansen

1969
 NK Baan, Sprint, Profs
 NK track race (50 km)

1970
 NK Baan, Sprint, Profs

1971
 NK Baan, Sprint, Profs
 World Champion track, Sprint, Elite

1972
 NK Baan, Sprint, Profs

1973'
 NK Baan, Sprint, Profs

1974
 NK Baan, Sprint, Profs

1975
 NK Baan, Sprint, Profs

1976
 NK Baan, Sprint, Profs

See also
 List of Dutch Olympic cyclists

External links
 Loeveseijn and Jansen about the Mexico Olympic Games, interview in Met het Oog op Morgen, 6 augustus 2012

References

1949 births
Living people
Dutch male cyclists
Cyclists at the 1968 Summer Olympics
Olympic cyclists of the Netherlands
Olympic medalists in cycling
Cyclists from Amsterdam
Medalists at the 1968 Summer Olympics
UCI Track Cycling World Champions (men)

Olympic silver medalists for the Netherlands
Dutch track cyclists
20th-century Dutch people
21st-century Dutch people